Hafsa Şeyda Burucu (born December 24, 1991 in Serdivan, Turkey) is a European champion Turkish karateka competing currently in the kumite -68 kg division. She is a member of Sakarya Büyükşehir Belediyespor Club.

Şeyda Burucu became European champion at the 2012 European Karate Championships held in Adeje, Tenerife, Spain. In 2013, she defended her European champion title in Budapest, Hungary.

Burucu was born to Tercan Burucu and his wife Saniye. She has two sisters Sümeyye and Zehra Rumeysa. She is a student of physical education at Sakarya University.

Achievements

References

1991 births
People from Serdivan
Living people
Turkish female karateka
Turkish female martial artists
Sakarya University alumni
European champions for Turkey
Mediterranean Games gold medalists for Turkey
Competitors at the 2013 Mediterranean Games
Mediterranean Games medalists in karate
European Games competitors for Turkey
Karateka at the 2015 European Games
21st-century Turkish women